was a village located in Aso District, Kumamoto Prefecture, Japan.

As of 2003, the village had an estimated population of 4,523 and a population density of 94.45 persons per km². The total area was 47.89 km².

On February 13, 2005, Hakusui, along with the villages of Chōyō and Kugino (all from Aso District), was merged to create the village of Minamiaso and no longer exists as an independent municipality.

References

External links
 Official website of Minamiaso 

Dissolved municipalities of Kumamoto Prefecture